Giannis Kalatzis (29 April 1943 – 13 July 2017) was a Greek singer who was especially popular in Greece in the late 1960s and the first half of the 1970s.

Giannis Kalatzis was born in Thessaloniki in 1943. His career as a singer began in the early 1960s when he was a member of the Trio Moreno in Thessaloniki. Kalatzis later moved to Athens, where he initially co-operated with the famous composer Giorgos Mitsakis. His popularity began to increase and he had a productive collaboration with some of the most famous Greek composers of the period – Manos Loizos, Stavros Kougioumtzis, Giorgos Katsaros, Mimis Plessas, Giannis Spanos, and Tolis Voskopoulos. Kalatzis participated in albums alongside singers such as Giorgos Dalaras, Haris Alexiou, Giannis Parios, Mariza Koch, Litsa Diamanti and Kostas Smokovitis. He also appeared in ten films.

In the second half of the 1970s, Kalatzis co-operated with composer Nikos Karvelas and in 1981 he released an album with the songs of Tolis Voskopoulos. His last album before giving up active singing was in 1984, however, in 1985, he took part in a big concert dedicated to composer Manos Loizos held in Athens Olympic Stadium. In 2000, he released a double CD, the first disc with his greatest hits in new versions and the second disc with famous Greek sons in his rendition. Kalatzis is considered one of the best singers of the time and his songs have been performed by younger singers as well.

In 2013 Giannis Kalatzis was honoured in the Greek version of the television programme Your Face Sounds Familiar broadcast by  ANT1 with actor Konstantinos Kazakos impersonating him and performing one of his most famous songs – 'Delfini delfinaki'.

Most famous songs
 I Gorgona (Stin Apano Yitonitsa) Music: Manos Loizos; Text: Lefteris Papadopoulos
 Paporaki Tou Burnova Music – Manos Loizos
 Dhelfini, Dhelfinaki Music: Manos Loizos; Text: Lefteris Papadopoulos
 Tzamaika Music – Manos Loizos
 To Palio Roloi Music – Manos Loizos
 Xenaki Ime Ke Tha 'Rtho Music – Stavros Kouyioumtzis
 O Stamoulis O Lochias Music – Giorgos Katsaros
 Paramythaki Mou Music – Manos Loizos (the song can be heard in the film The Exorcist (film))
 An Zousan I Arhei Music – Giorgos Mitsakis
 Isoun orea Music – Stavros Kouyioumtzis
 Ta hrisa klidia Music – Theodoros Derveniotis
 Kyra Giorgena Music – Giorgos Katsaros

Discography

Personal albums
1968: Giannis Kalatzis
1969: O Epipoleos
1970: Kyra Giorgena 
1971: Paramythaki Mou
1973: Ena Taxidi
1975: Ke I Zoi Sinechizete
1976: Mi Perimenis
1978: Kapios Panta Leei Antio
1979: Ta Kalitera Mou Tragoudia
1979: Pali Konta Sou
1981: Gia Olous
1984: Thymithite Me Ton Gianni Kalatzi
1989: I Megaliteres Epitihies Tou (Compilation)
1994: I Megales Epitihies (Compilation)
1996: Tragoudia Apo tis 45' Strofes

Collaborations
1968: Stathmos
1969: An Zousan I Archei
1969: Synantisi
1970: Thalassografies
1971: Zei?
1971: O Stamoulis O Lochias
1971: Otan Anthizoun I Paschalies
1972: I Ora Tis Gardenias
1972: Na 'Chame, Ti Na 'Chame
1974: 13 Periptosis
1974: Manolis Barberakis No. 2
1974: Odos Aristotelous
1974: Oh, Ti Kosmos? Mpampa
1974: 13 Periptosis
1974: Welcome To Greece No. 5
1977: Agapo Mia Pantremeni
1985: Manos Loizos – Afieroma, Live

TV appearances
Το Παρτυ της Ζωης Σου (2005) ALTER
Δρόμοι (2005) ΕΤ1 
Κοίτα τι Έκανες (2004) ΝΕΤ
Οδικές βοήθειες MEGA
Μαζί την Κυριακή (1996) ANT1
Ciao (1992) ANT1
Στιγμές από το ελληνικό τραγούδι (1990) ET2
Εν αρχή ην ο λόγος – Αφιέρωμα στον Πυθαγόρα (1988) ΕΤ2
Εν αρχή ην ο λόγος – Κώστας Βίρβος (1988) ΕΤ2
Γιώργος Κατσαρός – Παραλλαγές στο Ιδιο Θέμα (1986) ΕΡΤ
Λαϊκό πάλκο (1985) ΕΡΤ
Αφιέρωμα στον Μάνο Λοϊζο (1985) ΕΡΤ
Αφιερώματα – Θόδωρος Δερβενιώτης (1983) ΕΡΤ 
Σταύρος Κουγιουμτζής – 20 χρόνια Τραγούδι (1982) ΕΡΤ
Έξι ρεβεγιόν, εξήντα χρόνια (1978) ΕΡΤ
Στούντιο 3 (1978) ΕΡΤ
Ντο-Ρε-Μι (1974) ΕΙΡΤ
Δώδεκα μήνες τραγούδι (1973) ΕΙΡΤ
Σήμερα ΥΕΝΕΔ
Αλάτι και πιπέρι (1971) ΥΕΝΕΔ

References 

1943 births
2017 deaths
20th-century Greek male singers
Singers from Thessaloniki